Chester Jennings Poindexter [Jinx] (September 30, 1910 – March 3, 1983) was a pitcher in Major League Baseball who played for the Boston Red Sox (1936) and Philadelphia Phillies (1939). He was born in Pauls Valley, Oklahoma.

In a two-season-career, Poindexter posted a 0–2 record with a 4.83 ERA in 14 appearances, including one start, 14 strikeouts, 31 walks, and 41 innings of work.

Following baseball, Poindexter worked for Phillips Oil. He died in Norman, Oklahoma, at the age of 72.

See also
1936 Boston Red Sox season
1939 Philadelphia Phillies season

References

External links

1910 births
1983 deaths
People from Pauls Valley, Oklahoma
Boston Red Sox players
Philadelphia Phillies players
Major League Baseball pitchers
Baseball players from Oklahoma
Nashville Vols players
Atlanta Crackers players
Gladewater Bears players
Knoxville Smokies players
Little Rock Travelers players
Oklahoma City Indians players
Pauls Valley Raiders players
Texarkana Bears players
Tulsa Oilers (baseball) players